Harpalus opacipennis is a species of ground beetle in the subfamily Harpalinae. It was described by Haldemann in 1843.

References

opacipennis
Beetles described in 1843